Eilema elegans is a moth of the subfamily Arctiinae. It was described by Arthur Gardiner Butler in 1877. It is found in Ethiopia, South Africa, Zambia and Zimbabwe.

Subspecies
Eilema elegans elegans
Eilema elegans restricta Hampson, 1910 (Zambia)

References

elegans
Lepidoptera of Ethiopia
Insects of Somalia
Lepidoptera of Zambia
Lepidoptera of Zimbabwe
Moths of Sub-Saharan Africa
Moths described in 1877